The 2020–21 BYU Cougars men's basketball team represented Brigham Young University in the 2020–21 NCAA Division I men's basketball season. It was head coach Mark Pope's second season as BYU's head coach and the Cougars tenth season as members of the West Coast Conference (WCC). The Cougars played their home games at the Marriott Center in Provo, Utah. They finished the season 20-7, 10-3 in WCC Play to finish in 2nd place. They beat Pepperdine in the semifinals of the WCC tournament before losing in the championship game to Gonzaga. They received an at-large bid to the NCAA tournament where they lost in the First Round to UCLA.

Previous season 
The Cougars finished the 2019–20 season 24–8, 13–3 in West Coast Conference play to finish in second place. As the No. 2 seed in the WCC Tournament, they lost to Saint Mary's in the semifinals. Despite being a virtual lock to receive an at-large bid to the NCAA tournament, all postseason play was cancelled amid the COVID-19 pandemic.

Offseason

Departures 
Seven seniors departed from the basketball team either to graduation or a completion of their college eligibility. Three of the seven were starters - Yoeli Childs, T. J. Haws and Jake Toolson and two of them were important bench players that saw significant playing time - Zac Seljaas and Dalton Nixon. These seniors contributed 70% of the scoring for the prior year team. Blaze Nield also left the team after entering the transfer portal in March 2020. In April, he transferred to Utah Valley University making it the third team Nield had played for in as many years. He played his freshman season at Utah State University Eastern in Price, Utah. Evan Troy will continue with the team as a graduate assistant.

Incoming transfers 
On October 18, 2019, Spencer Johnson announced his decision to transfer from Salt Lake Community College to BYU. Johnson had initially committed to Weber State in 2016, but when he returned from serving a mission in Milan, Italy, he transferred to Utah Valley University partway through his redshirt freshman year. Then he decided to transfer to Salt Lake Community College where he played his first season of college basketball. For the 2020–21 season, Johnson is a redshirt sophomore, initially with 3 seasons of eligibility remaining. On February 24, Gideon George from New Mexico Junior College announced his decision to transfer to BYU. He will transfer as a junior and initially had two years of eligibility remaining. On April 23, 2020, Purdue center Matt Haarms decided to transfer to BYU for his final year of eligibility. Haarms, reported as the nation's top available transfer at the time, had previously narrowed his choices to BYU, Kentucky and Texas Tech despite 25 or more schools contacting him regarding his decision. Because he is a graduate transfer, Haarms is eligible to play immediately. On June 12, 2020, it was announced that Brandon Averette would transfer from UVU to play his final year of college eligibility for BYU. Because Averette is a graduate transfer, he is eligible to play for the 2020–21 season. In June 2020 Brandon Warr was reported to have transferred to BYU from Westminster College as a walk-on. Warr will redshirt the 2020–21 season and play what was intended to be his final year of college eligibility during the 2021–22 season.

On October 14, 2020, the NCAA announced that all student-athletes involved in winter sports in 2020–21, including men's and women's basketball, would receive an extra year of eligibility, regardless of whether they or their teams actually participated in the 2020–21 season. This special rule, introduced due to COVID-19, allows five years of eligibility for student-athletes instead of the normal four. All entries in the "Years Remaining" column reflect this policy.

Returned missionaries 
One returned missionary was added to the roster for the 2020–21 season. Hunter Erickson wore #1 and played at Timpview High School averaging 22 points his junior season. He is a 6'3" guard and weighs in at 185 pounds. He also received scholarship offers from Utah, Cal State Northridge and UC Santa Barbara. Due to the special NCAA eligibility rules for 2020–21, he will have five years of eligibility instead of the normal four.

Currently serving missionaries 
During the 2020–21 season, there are four team members that are currently serving full-time missions. Each of the four players have four years of eligibility remaining and will be part of the roster for the 2021–22 season. Nate Hansen and Trey Stewart will hold scholarship positions while Casey Brown and Jeremy DowDell will join as preferred walk-ons.

2020 recruiting class 
Six high school players committed to play for BYU from the 2020 recruiting class. Richie Saunders, Dallin Hall, Tanner Hayhurst and Tanner Toolson each plan to complete two-year full-time missionary service before joining the team for the 2022–23 season. Only Townsend Tripple and Caleb Lohner will join the roster for the 2020–21 season. Tripple had originally planned to complete missionary service before joining the team and was assigned to Argentina, but decided to delay his mission trip due to coronavirus and joined the roster as a walk-on. In early June, it was reported that Caleb Lohner, a four-star forward from Texas who had previously signed with Utah, requested a release from his National Letter of Intent to sign with BYU. Lohner was released, and on June 26 officially signed with the Cougars. Lohner will be a true freshman and is immediately eligible to play.

2021 Recruiting class 
Jake Wahlin committed to BYU in early September and officially signed on November 11, 2020. Wahlin was recruited by Arizona State, San Diego State and New Mexico as well as other schools. He plans to complete a mission trip and join the team for the 2023-24 season. In addition, forward Fousseyni Traore from Wasatch Academy signed with the Cougars on November 19, over schools such as Seton Hall and Utah State. He will join the program for the 2021-22 season. Atiki Ally Atiki, from the London Basketball Academy in Ontario, Canada, verbally committed to BYU on February 15, 2021 and will also join the program for the 2021-22 season.

Preseason polls and rankings 
In late October, BYU was selected to finish second in the West Coast Conference in the Preseason Men's Basketball Coaches Poll behind Gonzaga. Alex Barcello was named to the 2020-2021 All-WCC Pre-season Men's Basketball Team.

In early November, Matt Haarms was named as one of the preseason 20 players to watch regarding the Kareem Abdul-Jabbar Center of the Year Award. Throughout the preseason, several media outlets ranked BYU among the top 100 Division I college basketball preseason teams for the 2020-21 season. Consistent with the WCC preseason coaches poll, many of the writers projected BYU second among WCC teams. A summary of the various preseason rankings that included BYU is as follows:

Preseason injuries 
Several players dealt with injuries during the off-season. Jesse Wade had for some time had a knee injury which has prevented him from playing for BYU since he transferred from Gonzaga. He sat out the 2018–19 season due to his transfer, but was not able to play during the 2019–20 season due to his knee injury. Wade was cleared by doctors to practice with the team on June 1, 2020. Alex Barcello injured his wrist during the game at Pepperdine on February 29, 2020, yet still played 33 minutes in the final game of the season in the WCC tournament against St. Mary's. Barcello later had surgery on his wrist and was expected to be ready for team practices on June 1, 2020. Connor Harding had lingering knee issues during the 2019–20 season. Harding had knee surgery during the summer and is expected to be available to play at the start of the season. Wyatt Lowell announced via Instagram that he was going to have shoulder surgery on July 22, 2020. Lowell indicated that he had torn his labrum the prior week playing basketball. He is expected to be recovering for several months. At a media availability interview on November 12, Mark Pope indicated that Townsend Tripple had recently injured his knee and would not be available to play at the start of the season.

Roster

Media coverage

Radio 
Greg Wrubell and Mark Durrant return to call men's basketball for the 2020–21 season. Jason Shepherd will fill-in for Greg Wrubell whenever football conflicts arise (Dec 5 & 15), and Greg will call a few games solo due to COVID-19 restrictions. 

 Affiliates:

 BYU Radio- Flagship Station Nationwide (Dish Network 980, Sirius XM 143, KBYU 89.1 FM HD 2, TuneIn radio, and byuradio.org)
 KSL 102.7 FM and 1160 AM- (Salt Lake City / Provo, Utah and ksl.com)
 KSNA 100.7 FM - Blackfoot / Idaho Falls / Pocatello / Rexburg, Idaho (games)
 KSPZ 105.1 FM and 980 AM- Blackfoot / Idaho Falls / Pocatello / Rexburg, Idaho (coaches' shows)
 KMXD 100.5 FM- Monroe / Manti, Utah
 KSVC 980 AM- Richfield / Manti, Utah
 KDXU 94.9 FM and 890 AM- St. George, Utah

Television 
In September 2019, the West Coast Conference (WCC) agreed to a multi-year deal through the 2026-27 season with ESPN and the CBS Sports Network to broadcast numerous basketball games each year. Previously, the WCC had an agreement with ESPN, but the new agreement adds additional television coverage of basketball games through the CBS Sports Network. Games broadcast on the CBS Sports Network are carried on channel 158 on the Dish Network, channel 221 on DirecTV and channel 269 on Xfinity. Under the terms of the deal, ESPN will broadcast 17 games during the regular season and the CBS Sports Network will broadcast a minimum of 9 games. ESPN will continue to broadcast the quarterfinals, semifinals and the championship game of the WCC tournament. BYU maintains the rights to broadcast home games on BYUtv (11.1 in Salt Lake City, Utah, channel 374 on the Dish Network, and channel 4369/9403 on DirecTV). Meanwhile Stadium broadcasts will be simulcast on KJZZ or KMYU because Utah doesn't have a Stadium tv affiliate.

Schedule and results 
BYU's games against Pepperdine, San Diego, and Pacific on December 31, 2020 and January 2 and 7, 2021 were postponed due to COVID-19 cases within those programs.  On January 5, 2021, it was announced that BYU's road game against #1 Gonzaga had been moved from February 6 to January 7 to take the place of the postponed Pacific game. On January 8, it was announced that the Pepperdine game originally scheduled for December 31, 2020 had been moved to January 27, 2021. On January 26, it was announced that BYU's home game against San Francisco originally scheduled for January 30 had been postponed due to COVID-19 cases within San Francisco's program.

|-
!colspan=11 style=| Non-conference regular season

|-
!colspan=11 style=| WCC Regular Season

|-
!colspan=11 style=| WCC Tournament

 
|-
!colspan=11 style=| NCAA tournament

Game summaries
Series Histories are adjusted for the second consecutive season. On the series history the 47 wins the NCAA had BYU forfeit during the 2015–16 and 2016–17 seasons aren't indicated. The forfeits are not added to the loss column. They are merely struck from the win column. All rankings are from the AP poll unless specifically indicated otherwise.

Westminster
Series History: First Meeting

Broadcasters: Dave McCann, Blaine Fowler, & Spencer Linton 
Starting Lineups:
Westminster: Taylor Miller, Isaiah Banks, Reme Torbert, Brandon Willardson, Joey Andrews
BYU: Brandon Averette, Alex Barcello, Gavin Baxter, Kolby Lee, Connor Harding

New Orleans 
Series History: New Orleans leads 1–0

Broadcasters: Dave McCann, Blaine Fowler & Spencer Linton
Starting Lineups:
New Orleans: Damion Rosser, Lamont Berzat, Troy Green, Jahmel Myers, Ahren Freeman
BYU: Brandon Averette, Alex Barcello, Gavin Baxter, Kolby Lee, Connor Harding

UCCU Crosstown Clash: Utah Valley
Series History: BYU leads 3–1

Broadcasters: Dave McCann, Blaine Fowler, & Spencer Linton 
Starting Lineups:
Utah Valley: Fardaws Aimaq, Le'Tre Darthard, Jamison Overton, Jordan Brinson, Trey Woodbury
BYU: Brandon Averette, Alex Barcello, Caleb Lohner, Kolby Lee, Connor Harding

USC 
Series History: USC leads 7–3

Broadcasters: Jon Sciambi & Jon Crispin 
Starting Lineups:
BYU: Matt Haarms, Brandon Averette, Alex Barcello, Kolby Lee, Connor Harding 
USC: Tahj Eaddy, Isaiah Mobley, Evan Mobley, Drew Peterson, Ethan Anderson

St. John's
Series History: St. John's leads 7–1

Broadcasters:  Jon Sciambi & Jon Crispin
Starting Lineups:
BYU: Matt Haarms, Brandon Averette, Alex Barcello, Caleb Lohner, Connor Harding 
St. John's: Posh Alexander, Julian Champagne, Greg Williams Jr., Isaih Moore, Vince Cole

Utah State
Series History: BYU leads 142–92

Broadcasters: Scott Garrard & Lance Beckert 
Starting Lineups:
BYU: Matt Haarms, Brandon Averette, Alex Barcello, Caleb Lohner, Connor Harding 
Utah State: Brock Miller, Neemias Queta, Rollie Worster, Justin Bean, Marco Anthony

Boise State
Series History: BYU leads 9–5

Broadcasters: Dave McCann, Blaine Fowler, & Spencer Linton 
Starting Lineups:
Boise State: Mladen Armus, Abu Kigab, Rayj Dennis, Emmanuel Akot, Derrick Alston Jr.
BYU: Matt Haarms, Brandon Averette, Alex Barcello, Caleb Lohner, Connor Harding

Deseret First Duel: Utah
Series History: BYU leads 131–129

Broadcasters: Dave McCann, Blaine Fowler, & Spencer Linton 
Starting Lineups:
Utah: Mikael Jantunen, Timmy Allen, Branden Carlson, Alfonso Plummer, Rylan Jones
BYU: Matt Haarms, Brandon Averette, Alex Barcello, Kolby Lee, Connor Harding

San Diego State
Series History: BYU leads 48–26

Broadcasters: John Sadak & Steve Lappas 
Starting Lineups:
BYU: Matt Haarms, Brandon Averette, Alex Barcello, Kolby Lee, Connor Harding 
San Diego State: Nathan Mensa, Aguek Arop, Matt Mitchell, Trey Pulliam, Jordan Schakel

Texas Southern
Series History: BYU leads 2–0

Broadcasters: Dave McCann & Blaine Fowler 
Starting Lineups:
Texas Southern: Jordan Nicholas, John Walker III, Galen Alexander, John Jones, Michael Weathers
BYU: Matt Haarms, Brandon Averette, Alex Barcello, Kolby Lee, Connor Harding

Weber State
Series History: BYU leads 33–11

Broadcasters: Dave McCann, Blaine Fowler, & Spencer Linton
Starting Lineups:
Weber State: Cody Carlson, Dontay Bassett, Seikou Sisoho Jawara, Zahir Porter, Isiah Brown
BYU: Matt Haarms, Brandon Averette, Alex Barcello, Kolby Lee, Connor Harding

Gonzaga
Series History: Gonzaga leads 18–5

Broadcasters: Dave Flemming & Sean Farnham
Starting Lineups:
BYU: Matt Haarms, Brandon Averette, Alex Barcello, Kolby Lee, Connor Harding 
Gonzaga: Anton Watson, Drew Timme, Corey Kispert, Jalen Suggs, Joël Ayayi

Saint Mary's
Series History: Saint Mary's leads 16–14

Broadcasters: Dave Feldman & Corey Williams
Starting Lineups:
BYU: Matt Haarms, Brandon Averette, Alex Barcello, Trevin Knell, Kolby Lee
Saint Mary's: Matthias Tass, Dan Fotu, Jabe Mullins, Logan Johnson, Tommy Kuhse

San Francisco
Series History: BYU leads 19–9

Broadcasters: Eric Rothman & Richie Schueler
Starting Lineups:
BYU: Matt Haarms, Brandon Averette, Alex Barcello, Trevin Knell, Kolby Lee
San Francisco: Josh Kunen, Dzmitry Ryuny, Taavi Jurkatamm, Khalil Shabazz, Jamaree Bouyea

Portland
Series History: BYU leads 19–2

Broadcasters: Carter Blackburn & Avery Johnson
Starting Lineups:
Portland: Zac Triplett, Ahmed Ali, Latrell Jones, Eddie Davis, Michael Henn
BYU: Matt Haarms, Brandon Averette, Alex Barcello, Trevin Knell, Kolby Lee

Pepperdine
Series History: BYU leads 14–9

Broadcasters: Dave Flemming & Sean Farnham
Starting Lineups:
Pepperdine: Sedrick Altman, Colbey Ross, Kessler Edwards, Kene Chukwuka, Victor Ohia Obioha
BYU: Matt Haarms, Brandon Averette, Alex Barcello, Trevin Knell, Kolby Lee

Pepperdine
Series History: BYU leads 15–9

Broadcasters: J.B. Long & Wyking Jones
Starting Lineups:
BYU: Matt Haarms, Brandon Averette, Alex Barcello, Trevin Knell, Kolby Lee
Pepperdine: Sedrick Altman, Colbey Ross, Kessler Edwards, Kene Chukwuka, Victor Ohia Obioha

Pacific
Series History: BYU leads 10–6

Broadcasters: Jason Horowitz & Chris Walker
Starting Lineups:
Pacific: Jordan Bell, Pierre Crockrell II, Daniss Jenkins, Jeremiah Bailey, Broc Finstuen
BYU: Matt Haarms, Brandon Averette, Alex Barcello, Trevin Knell, Kolby Lee

Portland
Series History: BYU leads 20–2

Broadcasters: Ann Schatz & Francis Williams
Starting Lineups:
BYU: Matt Haarms, Brandon Averette, Gideon George, Alex Barcello, Caleb Lohner
Portland: Ahmed Ali, Latrell Jones, Eddie Davis, Hayden Curtiss, Michael Henn

Gonzaga
Series History: Gonzaga leads 19–5

Broadcasters: Dave Flemming & Sean Farnham
Starting Lineups:
Gonzaga: Jalen Suggs, Drew Timme, Andrew Nembhard, Joël Ayayi, Corey Kispert
BYU: Matt Haarms, Brandon Averette, Gideon George, Alex Barcello, Caleb Lohner

Pacific
Series History: BYU leads 11–6

Broadcasters: Rich Waltz & Dan Dickau
Starting Lineups:
BYU: Matt Haarms, Brandon Averette, Gideon George, Alex Barcello, Caleb Lohner
Pacific: Jordan Bell, Pierre Crockrell II, Daniss Jenkins, Jeremiah Bailey, Broc Finstuen

Loyola Marymount
Series History: BYU leads 13–5

Broadcasters: Jason Horowitz, Chris Walker, & Steve Donahue
Starting Lineups:
BYU: Matt Haarms, Brandon Averette, Gideon George, Alex Barcello, Caleb Lohner
Loyola Marymount: Eli Scott, Jalin Anderson, Mattias Markusson, Keli Leaupepe, Ivan Alipiev

San Francisco
Series History: BYU leads 20–9

Broadcasters: John Sadak & Chris Walker
Starting Lineups:
San Francisco: Khalil Shabazz, Jamaree Bouyea, Josh Kunen, Dzmitry Ryuny, Jonas Visser
BYU: Matt Haarms, Brandon Averette, Gideon George, Alex Barcello, Caleb Lohner

Saint Mary's
Series History: Saint Mary's leads 16–15

Broadcasters: Roxy Bernstein & Adrian Branch
Starting Lineups:
Saint Mary's: Logan Johnson, Matthias Tass, Tommy Kuhse, Judah Brown, Dan Fotu
BYU: Matt Haarms, Brandon Averette, Gideon George, Alex Barcello, Caleb Lohner

WCC Semifinal: Pepperdine
Series History: BYU leads 15–10

Broadcasters: Dave Flemming & Sean Farnham
Starting Lineups:
Pepperdine: Sedrick Altman, Colbey Ross, Jade' Smith, Kessler Edwards, Jan Zidek
BYU: Matt Haarms, Brandon Averette, Gideon George, Alex Barcello, Caleb Lohner

WCC Championship: Gonzaga
Series History: Gonzaga leads 20–5

Broadcasters: Dave Flemming & Sean Farnham (ESPN)
Ryan Radtke & Dan Dickau (Westwood One)
Starting Lineups:
BYU: Matt Haarms, Brandon Averette, Gideon George, Alex Barcello, Caleb Lohner
Gonzaga: Jalen Suggs, Drew Timme, Andrew Nembhard, Joël Ayayi, Corey Kispert

NCAA 1st Round: UCLA
Series History: Series Even 12–12

Broadcasters: Andrew Catalon, Steve Lappas & AJ Ross (CBS)
Brandon Gaudin & Dan Dickau (Westwood One)
Starting Lineups:
UCLA: Jules Bernard, Cody Riley, Johnny Juzang, Jaime Jaquez Jr., Tyger Campbell
BYU: Matt Haarms, Brandon Averette, Gideon George, Alex Barcello, Caleb Lohner

Rankings 

^The Coaches poll did not release a week 1 ranking.

Future opponents 
For the upcoming 2021–22 season, BYU is scheduled to play the following non-conference opponents:

 Arizona State - December 18, 2021 (neutral site @ Talking Stick Arena as part of the Jerry Colangelo Classic)
Iona (site TBD)

 San Diego State (home)

 Utah (away)

 Utah Valley (away)

See also

References 

 

2020-21
BYU
2020 in sports in Utah
2021 in sports in Utah
BYU